Leonardo Fioravanti (born 8 December 1997) is a surfer who represented Italy at the 2020 Summer Olympics, the first surfer from Italy to compete in the newly-added Olympic surfing competition.

Career 
Fioravanti competed in the 2016 US Open for surfing, pushing himself to compete despite injuries incurred during practice prior to the competition. He was eliminated in the contest, with indications that his injury contributed to his performance. He would go on to compete as the first surfer from Italy to perform at the inaugural Olympic surfing competition, replacing Jordy Smith from South Africa, who dropped out due to an injury. Fioravanti made it to the second round of the competition.

References

External links 
 Leonardo Fioravanti at the World Surf League.

Italian surfers
Living people
1997 births
Surfers at the 2020 Summer Olympics
Olympic surfers of Italy
World Surf League surfers